Altaria may refer to:

Altaria (Pokémon), a fictional species of Pokémon
Altaria (rail service), a Spanish rail line
Altaria (band), a Finnish musical group